The Arts & Business Council of New York (ABC/NY), also known as Arts & Business Council, Inc., is a nonprofit organization. ABC/NY, now a division of the national service organization Americans for the Arts, was formed in 1965 to join the resources of New York City's arts and business communities in order to strengthen both sectors.

ABC/NY serves arts organizations of all disciplines (arts education, dance, design, film, literature, media, museums, music, theater, visual arts, etc.) and sizes (annual operating budgets of less than $100,000 to greater than $100 million), as well as businesses of all sizes across industry sectors, throughout the five boroughs of New York City and, when possible, throughout New York State.

Activities include programs in volunteer development, professional development, and leadership development.

Programs

Volunteer development 

Business Volunteers for the Arts (BVA) places businessmen and women with expertise in areas such as strategic planning, marketing, finance, IT, and human resources, as pro bono management consultants with nonprofit arts groups.

Arts Board Recruitment/Training strengthens the leadership capacity of nonprofit arts organizations. Potential board members are trained in governance, fiscal management, fundraising, and advocacy. This program also provides board development workshops for arts organizations.

Leadership development 

The Multicultural Arts Management Internship program promotes diversity in administrative staffing, introducing undergraduates to career options with a business focus in the arts. Each year, a select group of students—with an emphasis on people of African-American, Asian-American, and Latino/a backgrounds—is matched with New York City arts organizations to complete summer-long, project-based internships in a variety of disciplines. Each intern is also paired with a mentor from the business community who is involved in the arts and who can provide additional career guidance and perspective.

Emerging Leaders of New York Arts (ELNYA), introduced in fall 2007, is the New York branch of a nationwide program that targets arts professionals under 35 or with less than five years' experience in the field. ELNYA provides these young professionals with opportunities to develop the contacts, skills, and knowledge they need to advance to senior leadership positions. This program offers social, professional development, and networking events, such as group discussions, panel Q&A, and an arts management book club, each planned and implemented by members.

The Arts Leadership Institute (ALI) offers executive education for mid-career arts managers. ALI provides both technical management skill building(e.g. budgeting, planning, fundraising, and board development) and personal leadership development (self-assessment, communications, delegation, decision-making, and time management).

Professional development 

ABC/NY helps arts organizations and individual artists to develop new audiences and earned income through a series of arts-specific marketing workshops on topics including branding, sponsorship, electronic communications, market research, and audience development and retention. These are complemented with a comprehensive marketing website created by national staff, and an annual national conference.  ABC/NY also offers practical training for arts managers, business volunteers, and nonprofit arts board members in areas such as budgeting and financial analysis, fundraising, and human resources. In 2010, several Arts & Business Council professional development workshops were in partnership with The Foundation Center and the Financial Women's Association.

Cultural tourism and economic development 

From 2000 to 2009, with the support of the New York State Council on the Arts, ABC/NY's Cultural Tourism Initiative provided funding and technical assistance to 93 grantees statewide to support partnership-based projects that joined the arts community with travel, tourism, retail, and hospitality organizations to attract new visitors. Helping stimulate economic development in, regions throughout the state and in neighborhoods in New York City outside of midtown Manhattan.

In 2010, ABC/NY established a partnership with the Harlem Arts Alliance to promote cultural tourism and economic development in Harlem. Promotions that combine arts and business offerings are offered weekly.

Encore Awards 
The annual Encore Awards of the Arts & Business Council of New York celebrate success in all four of these programmatic areas. The Awards honor arts and business partnerships, creative business volunteers, and excellence in arts management.

References

Non-profit organizations based in New York (state)
Internship programs